Tivoli railway station was a non-public timetable railway station operated by the South Eastern Railway (SER) between 1848 and .

History
The Tivoli Gardens in Margate opened in 1829. The station, a single platform with steps down to the gardens opened on 20 July 1848 and was located on the opposite side of Tivoli Road from the gardens. The station was not served by scheduled passenger trains but only by excursions to the gardens and race meetings at Margate Racecourse, situated nearby at Shottendane.

The gardens closed in 1867 and the last recorded race meeting was in 1871. Closure of the station was probably concurrent with these closures although the actual date of the station is unknown. The Railway Magazine for June 1906 stated that it had been over 30 years since the station closed.

The embankment of the former line to Tivoli station is still visible either side of the B2052, to the north of Tivoli Park Avenue.

References

Notes

Railway stations in Great Britain opened in 1848
Railway stations in Great Britain closed in 1867
Former South Eastern Railway (UK) stations
Disused railway stations in Kent
Margate